John Arthur Hughes (November 2, 1880 – May 25, 1942) was an officer in the United States Marine Corps and a Medal of Honor recipient for his role in the United States occupation of Veracruz.

Hughes joined the Marine Corps in March 1900, and was commissioned as an officer in December 1901. As the result of a gas attack during the Battle of Saint-Mihiel, he was medically retired with the rank of lieutenant colonel in July 1919.

Hughes died on May 25, 1942 and is buried at Arlington National Cemetery, Arlington, Virginia.

Medal of Honor citation
Rank and organization: Captain, U.S. Marine Corps. Born: 2 November 1880, New York, N.Y. Accredited to: New York. G.O. No.: 177, 4 December 1915. Other Navy award: Navy Cross.

Citation:

For distinguished conduct in battle, engagements of Vera Cruz, 21 and 22 April 1914. Capt. Hughes was in both days' fighting at the head of his company, and was eminent and conspicuous in his conduct, leading his men with skill and courage.

Navy Cross citation
Citation:
The Navy Cross is presented to John A. Hughes, Lieutenant Colonel, U.S. Marine Corps, for exceptionally meritorious and distinguished service as Battalion Commander, 1st Battalion, 6th Regiment Marines. In the operations of his battalion at Belleau Woods from the 10th to the 13th of June, 1918, Lieutenant Colonel Hughes showed himself a gallant, courageous and determined commander of men.Inflicting severe losses on the enemy, capturing many prisoners, twenty machine guns, six minnenwerfers and other booty. The brilliant success of this battalion was in a great measure due to his coolness in all crises, unfailing good humor and accurate judgment. Lieutenant Colonel Hughes led his men superbly under most trying conditions against the most distinguished elements of the German Army, administering to those organizations their first defeat.

See also

 List of Medal of Honor recipients (Veracruz)

References

External links
 
 

1880 births
1955 deaths
United States Marine Corps Medal of Honor recipients
United States Marine Corps officers
People from Manhattan
Burials at Arlington National Cemetery
United States Marine Corps personnel of World War I
Recipients of the Navy Cross (United States)
Recipients of the Croix de Guerre 1914–1918 (France)
Battle of Veracruz (1914) recipients of the Medal of Honor